Lucas Green may refer to:
Lucas Green, Lancashire, England
Lucas Green, Surrey, England